Clear Branch may refer to:

Clear Branch (Missouri River), a stream in Warren County, Missouri, United States
Clear Branch (Platte River), a stream in Platte County, Missouri, United States